The Long Revolution is a 1961 book by Raymond Williams. The "long revolution" of the title is a revolution in culture, which Williams sees as having unfolded alongside the democratic revolution and the industrial revolution.  It followed on from Culture and Society, which was his first widely read work.

With this book, Williams led the way in recognizing the importance of the growth of the popular press, the growth of standard English, and the growth of the reading public in English-speaking culture and in Western culture as a whole. In addition, Williams' discussion of how culture is to be defined and analyzed has been of considerable importance in the development of cultural studies as an independent discipline.

1961 non-fiction books
Chatto & Windus books